Daniel Mesotitsch (born 22 May 1976) is an Austrian former biathlete.

Career
Mesotitsch originally competed in cross-country skiing. However, in 1997 he was injured in a car crash and took up shooting during his recovery when he was unable to undertake ski training. He subsequently switched to biathlon.

He has competed in four Winter Olympics, in 2002, 2006, 2010 and 2014.  He won 2 medals: silver in the Men's relay in 2010, and a bronze in Men's relay in 2014. Both of the relays together with Dominik Landertinger, Simon Eder and Christoph Sumann.

He was named Sportsman of the Year in 2011 in his home state of Carinthia.

Mesotitsch announced on 22 March 2019 that he would retire from the sport on 26 March 2019 after the Austrian Championships.

Biathlon results
All results are sourced from the International Biathlon Union.

Olympic Games
2 medals (1 silver, 1 bronze)

*Mass start was added as an event in 2006, with the mixed relay being added in 2014.

World Championships
3 medals (1 silver, 2 bronze)

*During Olympic seasons competitions are only held for those events not included in the Olympic program.
**Mixed relay was added as an event in 2005.

Individual victories
3 victories (2 In, 1 Pu) 

*Results are from UIPMB and IBU races which include the Biathlon World Cup, Biathlon World Championships and the Winter Olympic Games.

References

External links
 
 
 
 
 

1976 births
Living people
Sportspeople from Villach
Austrian male biathletes
Biathletes at the 2002 Winter Olympics
Biathletes at the 2006 Winter Olympics
Biathletes at the 2010 Winter Olympics
Biathletes at the 2014 Winter Olympics
Olympic biathletes of Austria
Medalists at the 2010 Winter Olympics
Medalists at the 2014 Winter Olympics
Olympic medalists in biathlon
Olympic bronze medalists for Austria
Olympic silver medalists for Austria
Biathlon World Championships medalists